Siege of Laodicea can refer to:
 Siege of Laodicea (636), capture of Laodicea in Syria by the Rashidun Caliphate
 Siege of Laodicea (1119), capture of Laodicea in Phrygia by the Byzantine Empire